Bravo Glacier is a glacier on Greenwich Island in the South Shetland Islands, Antarctica extending 2.1 km in northwest-southeast direction and 2.3 km in southwest-northeast direction and draining the south slopes of Dryanovo Heights to flow southeastwards into Shopski Cove.

The feature was probably named after an officer in the Chilean ship Lientur that took part in the 1952-53 Chilean survey of Yankee Harbour.

Location

See also
 List of glaciers in the Antarctic
 Glaciology

Maps
 L.L. Ivanov et al. Antarctica: Livingston Island and Greenwich Island, South Shetland Islands. Scale 1:100000 topographic map. Sofia: Antarctic Place-names Commission of Bulgaria, 2005.
 L.L. Ivanov. Antarctica: Livingston Island and Greenwich, Robert, Snow and Smith Islands. Scale 1:120000 topographic map.  Troyan: Manfred Wörner Foundation, 2009.

References
 SCAR Composite Antarctic Gazetteer.

Glaciers of Greenwich Island